Tongcheng is a subdistrict of the city of Fuding, Fujian, People's Republic of China.

See also

List of township-level divisions of Fujian

References

Township-level divisions of Fujian
Subdistricts of the People's Republic of China